"Sing to Me" is a song by Australian singer songwriter Kate Miller-Heidke and released in July 2014 as the second single from Miller-Heidke's fourth studio album, O Vertigo!.

Track listing
Digital download
 "Sing To Me" - 3:37
 "Sing To Me (Denzal Park Mix)" - 3:21
 "Sing To Me (Denzal Park Extended Mix)" - 5:57

References

Kate Miller-Heidke songs
2014 songs
Songs written by Keir Nuttall
Songs written by Kate Miller-Heidke
Cooking Vinyl singles